Yorktown High School is a public high school located in Yorktown, Texas (U.S.) and classified as a 2A school by the UIL. It is part of the Yorktown Independent School District located in southwestern DeWitt County. In 2015, the school was rated "Met Standard" by the Texas Education Agency.

Athletics
The Yorktown Wildcats compete in the following sports - 

Baseball
Basketball
Cross Country
Football
Golf
Powerlifting
Softball
Tennis
Track and Field
Volleyball

State Titles
One Act Play - 
1995(2A)

References

External links
 
 Yorktown ISD

Schools in DeWitt County, Texas
Public high schools in Texas